The women's 4 × 100 metre medley relay event in swimming at the 2013 World Aquatics Championships took place on 4 August at the Palau Sant Jordi in Barcelona, Spain.

Records
Prior to this competition, the existing world and championship records were:

Results

Heats
The heats were held at 11:08.

Final
The final was held at 19:48.

References

External links
Barcelona 2013 Swimming Coverage

Medley relay 4x100 metre, women's
World Aquatics Championships
2013 in women's swimming